Rifia is a species of very small fresh water snail with an operculum, an aquatic operculate gastropod mollusks in the family Hydrobiidae.

Species
Species in the genus Rifia include:
 Rifia yacoubii Ghamizi, 2020

References

External links
 Ghamizi M. (2020). New stygobiont genus and new species (Gastropoda, Hydrobiidae) from the Rif (Morocco). Ecologica Montenegrina. 31: 50-56

Hydrobiidae